The Wittpenn Bridge is a vertical-lift bridge that carries New Jersey Route 7 over the Hackensack River connecting Kearny and Jersey City, New Jersey. It is named after H. Otto Wittpenn, a former mayor of Jersey City. The bridge has an annual average daily traffic (AADT) of nearly 50,000 vehicles, including about 2,000 trucks. In 2005, the bridge was raised to accommodate 80 boats passing underneath. The original span opened in 1930; a replacement opened in 2021.

Original structure

Bridge construction commenced in 1927, and it was opened to vehicular traffic on November 5, 1930. When raised, the bridge provided  of clearance for ships. Raising the lift span required 15 minutes. Following the opening of the 2021 span, demolition work commenced on this span with work being substantially complete by March 2022.

Replacement

The New Jersey Department of Transportation (NJDOT) replaced the Wittpenn Bridge and all its approach ramps (including connections to U.S. Route 1/9), a project estimated to cost $600 million, funded by federal dollars. The first phase of construction began in July 2011. The new span opened in 2021, and all associated project work is expected to be completed in 2022. The new bridge is situated just north of the existing bridge.

The reconstruction of the bridge was partially funded by the Port Authority of New York and New Jersey. In November 2018, the Federal Aviation Agency (FAA) investigated a complaint raised by United Airlines that the fees they were paying for Newark Airport use were being diverted to roadway and bridge projects such as the Wittpenn Bridge which are not owned or operated by the Port Authority of New York/New Jersey.

In October 2020 the third and final section of the orthotropic bridge deck was hoisted into place. The bridge opened on October 1, 2021.

In addition to Route 7, the new span carries the East Coast Greenway, a long-distance biking and walking trail, and the Meadowlands Connector, a New Jersey biking and walking trail that links Hudson and Essex counties.

See also
 List of crossings of the Hackensack River

References

External links

Wittpenn Bridge at Bridges & Tunnels
Wittpenn Bridge Replacement Project at New Jersey Department of Transportation
 Wittpenn Bridge at NYCroads.com
 

Bridges completed in 1930
Buildings and structures demolished in 2022
Bridges completed in 2021
Bridges in Hudson County, New Jersey
Road bridges in New Jersey
Vertical lift bridges in New Jersey
Bridges over the Hackensack River
Buildings and structures in Jersey City, New Jersey
Kearny, New Jersey